Mothakapalli Venkatarame Gowda Krishnappa (1 July 1918 – 1 August 1980), popularly known and referred to as M.V.K. was an Indian Freedom Fighter, Indian National Congress Politician, Social Reformer and Educationist, rendered immense service for the upliftment of the rural masses throughout his illustrious career, the contributions of Krishnappa to Karnataka in general and Kolar & Chikkaballapur Districts, in particular, are noteworthy and impressive and is a household name to the people of these regions, particularly the farming community and the underprivileged cherish his memory in gratitude.

He was a great visionary to whom the welfare of the underprivileged society was of paramount importance, in their welfare and upliftment he saw a bright future for the country.

Early life and education 
The ancestors of M.V.K. were close associates of Magadi Kempe Gowda and were custodians of his royal mint. They hailed from a hamlet called Roddam which is presently in Pavagada Taluk of Tumkur District. The ancestors of M.V.K. settled in Mothakpalli in Mulbagal Taluk of Kolar District, Karnataka. Even today the M.V.K. family is popularly known as Roddagaru Vokkaliga’s indicating the place of their origin.

Into this contented self-made religious family of agriculturists was born a third baby boy on 1/06/1918 to Venkatrame Gowda & Changamma, he was named Krishne Gowda, however, the boy re-christened himself at the tender age of 12 to M.V. Krishnappa. The ethical values nurtured through Folk Tales, Puranas and the lives of great men narrated by the grandmother to all the household children assembled, left a lasting impression on the young mind of Krishnappa.

Krishnappa had his primary education in his native village Mothakpalli, Middle School at Bangarpet and High School at KGF. He had a College education at the Intermediate College, Bangalore and Degree in Law from Maharaja’s College Mysore.

Quit India Movement & Freedom Struggle 
During his high school days at KGF, he noticed the inhuman condition under which the miners of the internationally reputed Tylor & Tylor company were working, the company indulged in notorious exploitative methods and extracted work from the miners, though the company was earning significantly high profits it did not provide basic amenities to the miners and any occasional demands from them were suppressed, the young spirit of Krishnappa couldn’t tolerate this oppression and he took up the cause of the miners and organized the agitated miners into a single unified unit and launched a movement for realizing their rights with the company. Tylor & Tylor initially didn’t care for this but the young Krishnappa remained incognito and intensified the agitation in the face of this agitation, the powerful English Company, which had the full support of the authorities, was compelled to yield. The miners finally gained their right to basic amenities and this struggle was to be the first eventful accomplishment in the life of Krishnappa and helped him to shape and sharpen his skills of leadership and laid a strong life-lasting foundation for the future agitations he was to launch along with fellow Freedom Fighters K.C.Reddy for the liberation of the country and the merging of Princely State Of Mysore with the Union Of India.

The coming of M.K. Gandhi into the political scenario of India changed the course of the Freedom Struggle as well as Freedom Fighters respectively including the young Krishnappa. During his college days, Krishnappa was instrumental in urging young students to take up the cause and join the Quit India Movement against the British Raj, Seetharama Shantananda, a young student who gave up his dream of becoming a scholar and joined the movement under the leadership of Krishnappa recalled and wrote in the “Quit India Golden Jubilee Memoirs” that “Krishnaanna (Krishnappa being his first name and "Anna" in the local language being big brother) was a leader of an outstanding merit who inculcated the spirit of Patriotism in myself which ultimately made me jump into the freedom movement”. In 1939 Satyagraha movement started in KGF under the guidance of M.V.Krishnappa, M. Ramakrishnan, and Doraiswami of Kolar, the goal of the Satyagraha Camp was to intensify the agitation.

Political career 
Belonging to the Indian National Congress, Krishnappa was elected to the Lower House of Indian Parliament, the First Lok Sabha from Kolar from 1952-1957 at the age of 31, subsequently elected to Second Lok Sabha from Tumkur from 1957-1962, re-elected from Tumkur to the Third Lok Sabha from 1962-1967,elected from Hoskote from 1967-1970, re-elected from Hoskote from 1971-1977 from Mysore State and from Chikballapur in Karnataka in 1977-1979.

He vacated his seat Tumkur in 1962 to make way for Ajit Prasad Jain, who had lost from Kairana in 1962 Indian general elections against Yashpal Singh, an Independent candidate. Subsequently he was inducted in S. R. Kanthi cabinet (1962) with Law & Parliamentary Affairs and Labour Portfolio, also nominated to Mysore Legislative Council on 14 May 1962 and remained as MLC till 6 March 1967 when he resigned following the nomination to Lok Sabha from Hoskote in 1967. He was inducted to Third Nijalingappa ministry in 1962 and was given the Revenue Portfolio till he was re-elected to Lok Sabha in 1967. He was instrumental in the Renovation and expansion of Sri Lakshmi Venkateshwara Swamy Temple, Bangaru Tirupathi, Guttahalli, Kolar district.

B. Rangappa was later nominated as MLC to his vacated seat on 3 May 1967 and got retired on 18 May 1970.

Krishnappa died in Bangalore on 1 August 1980, aged 62.

Family
His brother M. V. Venkatappa was also a politician and was the Karnataka Legislative Assembly speaker from 1999 to 2004. They were born in a Vokkaliga family.

His nephew Rajeev Gowda, (son of M. V. Venkatappa) was also an Indian politician and academician. He was a former member of parliament in the Rajya Sabha from 26 June 2014 till 25 June 2020 and a national spokesperson for the Indian National Congress.

References

External links
Official biographical sketch in Parliament of India website

1918 births
1980 deaths
India MPs 1952–1957
India MPs 1957–1962
India MPs 1962–1967
India MPs 1967–1970
India MPs 1971–1977
India MPs 1977–1979
Indian National Congress politicians from Karnataka
Lok Sabha members from Karnataka